Tour de Celeb is a Channel 5 cycling-based reality series.

The narrator of the series is Rick Edwards.

Transmissions

Trainers
Rob Hayles 
Dame Sarah Storey 
Asker Jeukendrup

Celebrities

Series 1 (2016)

External links
http://www.skoda.co.uk/about-us/cycling/tour-de-celeb

2010s British reality television series
2016 British television series debuts
Channel 5 (British TV channel) reality television shows
English-language television shows